Franz Karl Schubert (5 November 1795, Vienna - 20 March 1855, Vienna) was an Austrian landscape painter. One of his brothers was the famous composer, Franz Schubert.

Life and work 

From 1811 to 1822, he studied landscape painting at the Academy of Fine Arts, Vienna. While there, he was awarded the Gundel-Prize for excellence twice; in 1816 and 1817. He was not only active as a painter, but also worked as a writing and drawing teacher for many notable figures in upper-class Viennese society.

He married the milliner, Theresia Schwemminger, a sister of the painters Heinrich and Josef Schwemminger. Their two sons, Ferdinand (1824-1853) and Heinrich Carl, also became painters.

He died at the age of fifty-nine in Vienna's Alsergrund district. His works may be seen at several Vienna Museum sites, as well as in the Kupferstichkabinett (print room) at the Academy and the Kunsthaus Zürich.

References

Further reading

External links

1795 births
1855 deaths
Austrian painters
Austrian landscape painters
Academy of Fine Arts Vienna alumni
Artists from Vienna